Gerhard Schwarz (22 August 1902 – 13 October 1995) was a German church musician, organist and composer.

Life 

Born in Rusinowa (near Waldenburg), Silesia, Schwarz studied church and school music, philosophy and musicology in Berlin. On 1 November 1932 he became a member of the  NSDAP (member number 1.467.044). Schwarz founded the Spandauer Kirchenmusikschule and was organist at the new church in Berlin. 

After the "Machtergreifung" of the National Socialists, he edited the flag song of the NSDAP and subsequently composed various pieces of popular music in the spirit of National Socialism. In 1934 he became clerk at the Reichsjugendpfarrer. In addition, he was music advisor at the Oberbann Süd of the Hitlerjugend of the Kurmark, but was removed from this office in 1936 because of suspicion of homosexuality. 1940 he was organist in Düsseldorf. In 1941 he was drafted into the Wehrmacht, of which he was a member until 1945. He served as a corporal in the Silesian Landes-Schützen-Bataillon 590 and was, among other things, deployed in Świdnica to guard prisoners. In 1944 he became chief organist of Sankt Bernhard in Breslau.

In 1946 he first moved to Erfurt. In 1947 Schwarz became a teacher at the music academies in Leipzig and Berlin. In 1961 he became professor for improvisation at the Hochschule für Musik Köln.

Schwarz died in the  near Bebra at age 93.

Work 
 Melodie zum Weihnachtslied Also liebt Gott die arge Welt in Evangelisches Gesangbuch (Nr. 51)
 An die Freunde
 Kleiner Kalender (1938) for four-part choir

References

External links 

 
 Schwarz, Gerhard
 

German classical organists
Academic staff of the Hochschule für Musik und Tanz Köln
Academic staff of the University of Music and Theatre Leipzig
Nazi Party members
20th-century German composers
1902 births
1995 deaths
People from Silesia
German Army soldiers of World War II